Groove for Sigmoid Sinus is a groove in the posterior cranial fossa. It starts at lateral parts of occipital bone, curves around jugular process, and ends at posterior inferior angle of parietal bone. After that, groove for sigmoid sinus continues as groove for transverse sinus.

See also
 Sigmoid sinus

References

External links
 http://ect.downstate.edu/courseware/haonline/labs/l22/os0808.htm

Skull